Citrus reticulata Blanco may refer to: 

 Nanfengmiju
 Pixie mandarin